Aa Gale Lag Jaa is an Indian television series,  based on 1973's Bollywood film Aa Gale Lag Jaa, and broadcast on Zee TV, which premiered on 23 September 2002. The series was directed by Sunil Agnihotri and aired Monday through Thursday.

Cast
 Mamik Singh as Ritik
 Vijay Kushawaha
 Mona Ambegaonkar
 Tinnu Anand as Raju
 Sonia Kapoor as Preeti
 Sameer Malhotra
 Supriya Karnik
 Rushali Arora
 Vinod Kapoor
 Seema Pandey
 Sheetal Thakkar

References

Zee TV original programming
Indian television soap operas
2002 Indian television series debuts
Hindi-language television shows
Indian television shows based on films
Live action television shows based on films